The Samoa Tourism Authority (STA) is a state-owned enterprise responsible for the marketing of Samoa as a holiday destination and the sustainable development of new and existing tourism products in the country.

History
The authority was established  as the Samoa Visitors Bureau in 1986 following the passing of the Western Samoa Visitors Bureau Act in 1984.  The change of name to 'Samoa Tourism Authority' in 2002 was a shift to emphasize the broader concept of tourism.

Organisation Structure and Information
The STA's main office is located on the ground floor of the FMFMII Government Building in the Apia central business district.  It also operates the Visitor Information Centre on main Beach Road (opposite the Catholic Cathedral) and Information Booth at the Faleolo International Airport.  STA has Market Representative Offices in New Zealand, Australia and UK/Europe.

There are four core divisions of the STA, namely Marketing & Promotions, Planning & Development, Research & Statistics and Policy.  The Finance & Corporate Services division provides the necessary administrative support services.  Tuilaepa Sailele Malielegaoi is the current Minister of Tourism.

Community Activities
The STA plays a key role in the National Beautification Committee.  It also coordinates the annual Teuila Festival, as well as the Miss Samoa Pageant in collaboration with Manaia Events.

References

External links
Samoa Tourism Authority Official Website
Government of Samoa

Tourism agencies
Tourism in Samoa
Organisations based in Samoa